Thangaikkor Geetham is a 1983 Indian Tamil-language film written, directed and scored by T. Rajendar. The film stars Sivakumar, Rajendar, Anand Babu and Nalini. It was released on 4 November 1983, and became a box office hit.

Plot 
Soolakaruppan is forced to give up his education as a young child to care for his younger sister, Sudha. He eventually leaves home with his sister as his alcoholic father and abusive stepmother won't care for them. He works odd jobs to support them and lands a job in Senthamarai's factory as a worker. Soolakaruppan can't stand injustice and gets into fights when he sees any wrong committed. This gets him into trouble as he antagonised his boss and the boss's son. Despite his hardships, Soolakaruppan insists on Sudha completing college. While at college, Sudha falls in love with Babu but avoids him when she realises his true womanising character. Inspector Harichandran is determined to marry a poor, educated woman and doesn't believe in asking for a dowry though his aunt and uncle want a rich bride. Soolakaruppan arranges Sudha's marriage with Harichandran whose family insists on a large dowry without his knowledge. Soolakaruppan isn't able to get the money at the last minute due to his boss' machinations. He arranges the marriage using fake jewellery. Sudha marries Harichandran but decides to hide her past from her husband to avoid any drama. Shortly after the wedding, Senthamarai frames Soolakaruppan for crimes he did not commit, and Harichandran is forced to arrest his brother-in-law. The fake jewellery is also discovered and Babu re-enters Sudha's life to blackmail her. Soolakaruppan must go to extraordinary lengths to ensure Sudha can live happily with Harichandran.

Cast

Production 
Thangaikkor Geetham is the debut for Anand Babu as an actor.

Soundtrack 
The music was composed by Rajendar, who also wrote the lyrics. For the Telugu-dubbed version Prema Samrajyam, all lyrics were written by Rajasri.

Tamil version

Telugu version

Reception 
Thangaikkor Geetham was released on 4 November 1983, Diwali day. Jayamanmadhan of Kalki appreciated the music, but said the film was fatigue inducing.

Legacy 
The dialogue "Vaada En Machi Vaazhakka Bajji" got a cult following, and was used in a scene in the 2017 film Kavan in which Rajendar's character signs this dialogue instead of his signature. The dialogue is also used in the 2021 film Master, moments before JD (Vijay) kills Bhavani (Vijay Sethupathi).

References

External links 
 

1980s Tamil-language films
1983 films
Films directed by T. Rajendar
Films scored by T. Rajendar
Films with screenplays by T. Rajendar